LGBT-free zones or LGBT ideology-free zones are municipalities and regions of Poland that have declared themselves unwelcoming of what they described as "LGBT ideology", in order to ban equality marches and other LGBT events. By June 2020, some 100 municipalities  and five voivodeships, encompassing a third of the country, had adopted resolutions which have been characterized as "LGBT-free zones".
In September 2021, four of the voivodeships withdrew the measures, after the EU threatened to withhold funding. Poland's Human Rights Ombudsman challenged several LGBT-free zone resolutions and on 28 June 2022, a top Polish appeals court upheld lower court rulings that had annulled these resolutions, abolishing them in four municipalities. Supporters argue that the zones defend traditional family values, while opponents argue that the zones undermine the rights of LGBT people.

Most of the adopted resolutions were lobbied for by an ultra-conservative Catholic organisation, Ordo Iuris. While unenforceable and primarily symbolic, the declarations represent an attempt to stigmatize LGBT people. The Economist considers the zones "a legally meaningless gimmick with the practical effect of declaring open season on gay people". In a December 2020 report, the Council of Europe Commissioner for Human Rights stated that "Far from being merely words on paper, these declarations and charters directly impact the lives of LGBTI people in Poland."

On 18 December 2019, the European Parliament voted, 463 to 107, to condemn the more than 80 such zones in Poland. In July 2020, the voivodeship administrative courts in Gliwice and Radom ruled that the "LGBT ideology free zones" established by the local authorities in Istebna and Klwów gminas respectively are null and void, stressing that they violate the constitution and are discriminatory against members of the LGBT community living in those counties.

Since July 2020, the European Union has denied funding from the Structural Funds and Cohesion Fund to municipalities that have adopted "LGBT-free" declarations, which are in violation of the EU Charter of Fundamental Rights. Poland is the only member state to have an opt-out from the Charter of Fundamental Rights, which it had signed upon its accession to the EU in 2004. In addition, several European sister cities have frozen their partnerships with the Polish municipalities in question. Due to their violation of European law, including Article 7 of the Treaty on European Union, these zones are considered part of the Polish rule-of-law crisis.

Background 

In February 2019, Warsaw's liberal mayor Rafał Trzaskowski signed a declaration supporting LGBTQ rights, and announced his intention to follow World Health Organization guidelines and integrate LGBT issues into the Warsaw school system sex education curricula. Law and Justice (PiS) politicians objected to the program saying it would sexualize children. PiS party leader Jarosław Kaczyński responded to the declaration, calling LGBT rights "an import" that threatens Poland.

According to The Daily Telegraph, the declaration "enraged and galvanized" conservative politicians and conservative media in Poland, the "LGBT-free zone" declarations emerging as a reaction to the Warsaw declaration. The British newspaper further argues that the conservative establishment is fearful of a liberal transition that may erode the Catholic Church's power in Poland like the transition around the Irish Church. Decreasing Church attendance, rising secularization, and sexual abuse scandals have put pressure on the conservative position.

Two weeks prior to the 2019 European Parliament election, a documentary on child sex abuse in the Church, was released online. It was expected to hurt the Church-aligned PiS electorally, and was responded to by PiS leader Kaczyński speaking heatedly of the Polish nation and children as "being under attack by deviant foreign ideas", which led conservative voters to rally around PiS. According to feminist scholar Agnieszka Graff, "The attack on LGBT was triggered by the [Warsaw] Declaration, but that was just a welcome excuse", as PiS sought to woo the rural-traditional demographic and needed a scapegoat to replace migrants.

In the run-up to the 13 October 2019 Polish parliamentary election, the Law and Justice party focused on countering "LGBT ideology". In 2019, it rebuked the Warsaw mayor's pro-LGBTQ declaration as "an attack on the family and children" and stated that LGBTQ was an "imported" ideology.

In August 2019, the Archbishop of Kraków, Marek Jędraszewski, said "LGBT ideology" was like a "rainbow plague" in a sermon commemorating the Warsaw uprising. Not long after, a drag queen simulated Jędraszewski's murder on stage, stirring controversy.

, being openly gay in Poland's small towns and rural areas "[takes] increasing physical and mental fortitude" due to the efforts of Polish authorities and the Catholic Church, according to The Daily Telegraph. Public perception, however, has been becoming more tolerant of gay people. The 41 percent of Poles surveyed in 2001 stating that "being gay wasn't normal and shouldn't be tolerated" dropped to 24 percent in 2017, and the 5 percent who said "being gay was normal" in 2001 had grown to 16 percent in 2017.

Declarations 
Anti-LGBT resolutions were passed by some Polish gminas (municipalities), powiats (counties), and voivodeships (provinces) who declared themselves free from “LGBT ideology” in reaction to the Warsaw Declaration. While unenforceable, activists say the declared zones represent attempts to exclude the LGBT community and called the declarations "a statement saying that a specific kind of people is not welcome there."

The two documents declared by municipalities were a "Local Government Charter of The Rights of The Family", and a "Resolution against LGBT ideology". Both of these documents were labelled in media as "declarations of LGBT-free zones", but neither of them actually contain a statement of exclusion of LGBT people from any territory, activities or rights. The "Charter of Family Rights" focuses on family values in social policies and only refers to LGBT rights indirectly, such as by defining marriage as a relationship "between a man and a woman". The "Resolution against LGBT ideology" does not speak to LGBT people, but declares opposition to an "ideology of the LGBT movement" and introducing sex education in line with WHO education standards and condemns political correctness. An interactive map of Poland marking all municipalities which accepted either one or both of these resolutions, with links to their original texts, is available online, under the titles "Atlas of Hate".

, around 30 different local governments have accepted such resolutions, including four voivodeships in the south-east of the country: Lesser Poland, Podkarpackie, Świętokrzyskie, and Lublin. The four Voivodeships form the "historically conservative" part of Poland.

, local governments controlling a third of Poland officially declared themselves as "against "LGBT ideology" or passed “pro-family” Charters, pledging to refrain from encouraging tolerance or funding NGOs working for LGBT rights.

Voivodeships (provinces) 
 Lublin Voivodeship, revoked by the voivodeship's authorities on 27 September 2021
 Lesser Poland Voivodeship, revoked by the voivodeship's authorities on 27 September 2021
 Podkarpackie Voivodeship, revoked by the voivodeship's authorities on 27 September 2021
 Świętokrzyskie Voivodeship, revoked by the voivodeship's authorities on 22 September 2021
 Łódź Voivodeship

Powiats (counties) 

 Powiat białostocki
 Powiat bielski
 Powiat dębicki
 Powiat jarosławski
 Powiat kielecki
 Powiat kolbuszowski
 Powiat krasnostawski
 Powiat kraśnicki
 Powiat leski
 Powiat limanowski
 Powiat lubaczowski
 Powiat lubelski
 Powiat łańcucki
 Powiat łowicki
 Powiat łukowski
 Powiat mielecki
 Powiat nowotarski
 Powiat opoczyński
 Powiat przasnyski
 Powiat przysuski
 Powiat puławski
 Powiat radomski
 Powiat radzyński
 Powiat rawski
 Powiat rycki
 Powiat sztumski
 Powiat świdnicki
 Powiat tarnowski
 Powiat tatrzański
 Powiat tomaszowski
 Powiat wieluński
 Powiat włoszczowski
 Powiat zamojski

Gminas (municipalities) 

 Gromnik
 Istebna, revoked by court ruling, ruling upheld on appeal
 Jordanów (gmina wiejska) withdrawn by the town council in January 2023 
 Klwów, revoked by court ruling, ruling upheld on appeal
 Kraśnik, withdrawn by city council in April 2021
 Końskowola, withdrawn by the town council in January 2023 
 Kock,
 Konstantynów,
 Lipinki
 Łososina Dolna
 Mełgiew
 Mordy
 Moszczenica withdrawn by the town council in January 2023 
 Niebylec
 Osiek, revoked by court ruling, ruling upheld on appeal
  Ostrów Lubelski
  Poniatowa
  Potworów
  Przeworsk withdrawn by the town council in January 2023 
  Szczytniki
  Świdnik withdrawn by the town council in January 2023 
  Stary Zamość
 Serniki, revoked by court ruling, ruling upheld on appeal
 Szerzyny withdrawn by the town council in January 2023 
 Trzebieszów
 Tuchów withdrawn by the town council in October 2021
 Tuszów Narodowy
 Urzędów
  Wilkołaz
  Zwierzyniec
  Zarzecze withdrawn by the town council in January 2023 
 Zakrzówek
 Skierniewice
Radziechowy-Wieprz, repealed in October 2020 by the voivode of the Silesian Voivodeship, Jarosław Wieczorek

Anti-LGBT stickers and pro-LGBT public art activism 

In July 2019, the conservative Gazeta Polska newspaper issued "LGBT-free zone" stickers to readers. The Polish opposition and diplomats, including US ambassador to Poland Georgette Mosbacher, condemned the stickers. Gazeta Polska editor in chief Tomasz Sakiewicz replied to the criticism with: "what is happening is the best evidence that LGBT is a totalitarian ideology".

The Warsaw district court ordered that distribution of the stickers should halt pending the resolution of a court case. Gazeta Polska editor dismissed the ruling saying it was "fake news" and censorship, and that the paper would continue distributing the stickers. Gazeta Polska continued distribution of the stickers, but modified the decal to read "LGBT Ideology-Free Zone".

Poland's Campaign Against Homophobia responded by issuing 5,000 "hate-free zone" stickers distributed in gay magazine Replika. In July, Polish media chain Empik, the country's largest, refused to stock Gazeta Polska after it issued the stickers. In August 2019, a show organized by the Gazeta Polska Community of America scheduled for October 24 in Carnegie Hall in New York was cancelled after complaints of anti-LGBT ties led to artists pulling out of the show.

In early 2020, Polish LGBT activist Bartosz Staszewski travelled to municipalities that had said they are free from what they referred to as "LGBT ideology" to undertake what he said was a performance art project. He affixed his own yellow street signs saying "LGBT-FREE ZONE" at the entrance to the municipalities, and posted photos of them to social media.

The signs were so convincing that MEP Guy Verhofstadt responded by denouncing what he had mistaken for official street signage. Prime Minister Mateusz Morawiecki described the signs as a "hoax" that had caused people to believe Poland was violating human rights, and Staszewski has been sued by at least two of the towns. Staszewski described his work as "a symbolic response to the symbolic resolutions".

In a debate between Polish conservative Witold Waszczykowski and German liberal Alexander Graf Lambsdorff published in  Zeit Online, Waszczykowski attributed the concept of the "LGBT-free zone" to the activism. He said: "There are no "LGBT-free zones" in Poland. This is a provocation created by activists. They travel from town to town, put up these signs reading "LGBT-free zone," take pictures and circulate them on social media. Zeit replied: "Indeed, there is no "LGBT-free zone" by definition, but there are more than 80 county, city and regional councils that have adopted so-called family charters. In many cases these charters say that there should be no propaganda of a so-called "LGBT ideology" and they also state that "LGBT ideology" contradicts Christian values."

Demonstrations 

In Rzeszów, after LGBT activists submitted a request to hold an equality march for gay rights in June 2019, PiS councillors drafted a resolution to make Rzeszów an "LGBT-free zone" as well as outlaw the event itself. Some 29 requests for counter-demonstrations reached city hall, which led mayor Tadeusz Ferenc, of the opposition Democratic Left Alliance, to ban the march due to security concerns. When the ban was then overturned by a court ruling, PiS councillors put forward a resolution outlawing "LGBT ideology", which was defeated by two votes.

Following the violent events in the first Białystok equality march and the Gazeta Polska stickers a demonstration for tolerance was held in Gdańsk on 23 July 2019, with the slogan "zone free of zones". In Szczecin a demonstration under the slogan of "hate-free zone" took place, and in Łódź left-wing politicians handed out "hate-free zone" stickers.

Effects on LGBT residents
According to a December 2020 report by the Council of Europe Commissioner for Human Rights:

Reactions

Support for declarations 
Bożena Bieryło, a PiS councilwoman in Białystok County, said the legislation in Białystok county was required due to LGBT "provocations" and "demands" for sex education instruction.

The national PiS party has encouraged the local declarations, with a PiS official handing out medals in Lublin to local politicians who supported the declarations.

Criticism of declarations 
In July 2019, Polish Ombudsman Adam Bodnar stated that "the government is increasing homophobic sentiments" with remarks "on the margins of hate speech". Bodnar said he is preparing an appeal to the administrative court against the declarations, as according to Bodnar they are not only political but also have a normative character that affects the lives of people in the declared region.

In August 2019, multiple LGBT community members stated that they feel unsafe in Poland. The left-wing Razem party stated: "Remember how the right [were scared] of the so-called [Muslim] no-go zones? Thanks to the same right, we have our own no-go zones."

Liberal politicians and media and human rights activists have compared the declarations to Nazi-era declarations of areas being judenfrei (free of Jews). Left-leaning Italian newspaper la Repubblica called it "a concept that evokes the term 'Judenfrei'". Campaign Against Homophobia director Slava Melnyk compared the declarations to "1933, when there were also free zones from a specific group of people." Warsaw's deputy president Paweł Rabiej tweeted, "The German fascists created zones free of Jews. Apartheid, of blacks."

In March 2020, BBC Radio 4 broadcast a documentary on the opposition of the LGBT community in Poland against the introduction of LGBT-free zones in the country.

In April 2020, during the COVID-19 pandemic, many within the LGBT community began handing out rainbow facemasks and other P.P.E. as a direct protest of the "LGBT-free zoning" within certain local government areas of Poland.

On 17 August 2020, an open letter to the President of the European Commission, Ursula von der Leyen, was published urging the European Union "to take immediate steps in defense of basic European values [...] which have been violated in Poland" and expressing "a deep concern over the future of democracy in Poland". It also appealed to the Polish government to stop targeting sexual minorities as enemies and to withdraw support from organizations promoting homophobia. The signatories of the letter included among others: Pedro Almodóvar, Timothy Garton Ash, Margaret Atwood, John Banville, Judith Butler, John Maxwell Coetzee, Stephen Daldry, Luca Guadagnino, Ed Harris, Agnieszka Holland, Isabelle Huppert, Jan Komasa, Yorgos Lanthimos, Mike Leigh, Paweł Pawlikowski, Volker Schlöndorff, Stellan Skarsgård, Timothy Snyder, Olga Tokarczuk, Adam Zagajewski and Slavoj Žižek.

In September 2020, the American presidential candidate Joe Biden also condemned LGBT-free zones in Poland via Twitter stating that "LGBTQ+ rights are human rights — and “LGBT-free zones” have no place in the European Union or anywhere in the world". The Polish embassy in Washington, D.C. replied that Biden's Tweet had been "based on inaccurate media information, as no 'LGBT-free zones' exist in Poland."

The Atlas of Hate organization, which keeps track of the anti-LGBT resolutions, was nominated for the Sakharov Prize by 43 MEPs.

As of 2020, the watchdog group ILGA-Europe identified Poland's respect for LGBTI rights as the worst of all 27 EU countries.

Reaction from the European Union 

On 18 December 2019, the European Parliament voted (463 to 107) in favour of condemning the more than 80 LGBT-free zones in Poland. Parliament demanded that "Polish authorities (are) to condemn these acts and (are) to revoke all resolutions attacking LGBT rights". According to the EU Parliament, the zones are part of "a broader context of attacks against the LGBT community in Poland, which include growing hate speech by public and elected officials and public media, as well as attacks and bans on Pride marches and actions such as 'Rainbow Fridays'.".

Based upon numerous complaints that "some local governments have adopted discriminatory declarations and resolutions targeting LGBT people", the European Commission wrote to the governors of five Voivodeships – Lublin, Łódź, Lesser Poland, Podkarpackie, and Świętokrzyskie – on 2 June 2020, instructing them to investigate local resolutions proclaiming LGBT-free zones or a "Charter of Family Rights", and whether such resolutions constituted discriminatory actions towards LGBT-identifying people or not.
The letter can be seen as an extension of the 2019 vote in the European Parliament condemning the zones, as it notes that failure by Poland to adhere to common values of the European Union of “respect for human dignity, freedom, democracy, equality, the rule of law and respect for human rights, including the rights of persons belonging to minorities”, as stated in Article 2 of the 2012 European Union Treaty could result in the loss of EU funds granted to the Republic of Poland in the future, such as European Structural and Investment.

In July 2020, Commissioner Dalli announced that applications for EU-funded town twinnings from six Polish towns had been rejected because of their adoption of "LGBT-free" or "family rights" resolutions.

In her September 2020 State of the European Union speech, Ursula von der Leyen stated, "LGBTQI-free zones are humanity-free zones. And they have no place in our Union."

In March 2021, on the initiative of the French MEP Pierre Karleskind, the European Parliament declared the entire European Union an "LGBTIQ Freedom Zone" in response to the backsliding of LGBTIQ rights in some EU countries, notably in Poland and in Hungary.

On September 2021, the European Commission sent letters to several Polish regional councils indicating that EU funds will be withdrawn if they do not abandon their LGBT-free zone policy.

The European Commission has blocked 150 million Euro funds for LGBT-free zones, and also blocked a 42 billion Euro payment from the Covid-recovery fund, due to Poland not obeying EU law.

International agreements 

In February 2020, the French commune of Saint-Jean-de-Braye decided to suspend the partnership with the Polish city of Tuchów as a result of the controversial anti-LGBT resolution passed by the Tuchów authorities. In February 2020, the French commune of Nogent-sur-Oise suspended its partnership with the Polish city of Kraśnik as a reaction to the passing of an anti-LGBT resolution by the city authorities. In February 2020, the French region of Centre-Val de Loire suspended its partnership with the Lesser Poland Voivodeship as a response to the establishment of an "LGBT-free zone" resolution by the voivodeship's authorities. In May 2020, the German city of Schwerte ended its city partnership with the Polish city of Nowy Sącz after 30 years of cooperation due to the town's adoption of a resolution discriminating against LGBT people. In July 2020, the Dutch city of Nieuwegein as well as the French city of Douai ended their twin city agreements with the Polish city of Puławy due to a "gay free zone" proclamation made in the latter. On 12 October 2020, the Irish city of Fermoy ended its twin town agreement with Nowa Dęba after 14 years of cooperation as a reaction to the homophobic LGBT-free zone declaration adopted by the Polish city's authorities. On 13 November 2020, the Belgian municipality of Puurs-Sint-Amands suspended its 20-year-long partnership with the Polish town of Dębica because of the town's adoption of the Charter of The Rights of The Family, which discriminates LGBT people.

In July 2020, the European Commissioner for Justice and Equality Helena Dalli announced that six Polish cities which adopted the "LGBT-free zones" would not be granted EU funds related to financing projects within the EU twinning project framework as a direct consequence of their discriminatory policies directed against members of the LGBT community. The decision met with criticism from the Minister of Justice Zbigniew Ziobro, however, the President of the European Commission Ursula von der Leyen defended the decision adding that "Our treaties ensure that every person in Europe is free to be who they are, live where they like, love who they want, and aim as high as they want." However, on 18 August, Justice Minister Zbigniew Ziobro announced that the town of Tuchów in southern Poland would now receive 250,000 zlotys ($67,800) from the ministry's Justice Fund, to compensate for the EU funding reversal.

In September 2020, Ine Marie Eriksen Søreide, the Norwegian Minister of Foreign Affairs, announced that the Polish municipalities which introduced the LGBT-free zones would be denied the EEA and Norway Grants whose aim is the reduction of social and economic disparities in the European Economic Area (EEA). Poland is the biggest beneficiary of these funds and could potentially lose millions of euros of financial aid. The suspension of funds only applies to the government bodies that have themselves adopted resolutions and does not apply to non-governmental organizations that operate in the LGBT-free zones.

In September 2020, a group of MEPs published a letter addressed to the European Olympic Committees (EOC) in which they demanded to respect the rights of LGBTI athletes and expressed an idea to host the 2023 European Games, which had been scheduled to take place in Kraków, in a different location due to the region's LGBT-free zone status.

Repeal and cancellation of anti-LGBT declarations 
In September 2021, three Polish regions repealed their own anti-LGBT declarations in response to the threat of a funding freeze from the EU, due to its anti-discrimination laws.

In June 2022, a top appeals court in Poland ordered four of the so-called "LGBT-free zones" to be scrapped.

See also 

 Anti-gender movement
 August 2020 LGBT protests in Poland
 Backlash (sociology)
 Censorship of LGBT issues
 Judenfrei
 LGBT agenda
 LGBT history in Poland
 LGBT rights in Poland
 Moral panic
 Opposition to LGBT rights
 Political activity of the Catholic Church on LGBT issues in Poland

References

External links 
 Atlas nienawiści (Atlas of Hate) - Map of anti-LGBT ideology Polish government resolutions
 Tu nie chodzi o ludzi(This is not about people) - a documentary film presenting fragments of political debates on so-called anti-LGBT resolutions

2019 in LGBT history
2019 in Poland
2019 in law
2020 in law
2020 in LGBT history
2020 in Poland
2020 in the European Union
Anti-LGBT sentiment
Censorship in Poland
Controversies in Poland
Discrimination against LGBT people
Euroscepticism in Poland
Far-right politics in Poland
LGBT-related controversies
LGBT rights in Poland
Legal history of Poland
Moral panic
Law of Poland
Political controversies in Europe
Right-wing populism in Poland
Scares
2010s neologisms
Censorship of LGBT issues
Homophobia
Human rights abuses in Poland